Step Up may refer to:

Film and television
 Step Up (franchise)
 Step Up (film), a 2006 film
 Step Up (Original Soundtrack), the soundtrack to the film
 Step Up 2: The Streets, the 2008 sequel
 Step Up 3D, the 2010 sequel
 Step Up Revolution, the 2012 sequel
 Step Up: All In, the 2014 sequel
 Step Up: High Water, a 2018 TV series

Music
 Step Up (Angelas Dish album), 2009
 Step Up (Flamin' Groovies album), 1991
 Step Up (Miss A album), 2010
 Step Up (Tower of Power album), 2020
 "Step Up" (The Cheetah Girls song), 2006
 "Step Up" (Darin song), a 2005 by Darin
 "Step Up" (Drowning Pool song), a 2004 song by Drowning Pool
 "Step Up" (Samantha Jade song), a 2006 song by Samantha Jade
 "Step Up", a song by Devo from Something for Everybody
 "Step Up", a 2009 song by Enter Shikari
 "Step Up", a song by Kurupt from Tha Streetz Iz a Mutha, 1999
 "Step Up", a song by Linkin Park (then known as Hybrid Theory) from the Hybrid Theory EP, 1999

Other uses
 Step Up (The Price Is Right), a segment game on the game show The Price is Right
 Boost converter, or step-up converter, a kind of power converter

See also

zh:舞力全开